Ogechi is a given name. Notable people with the name include:

 Ogechi Adeola, Nigerian business academic
 Ogechi Ogwudu, Nigerian taekwondo practitioner
 Ogechi Onyinanya (born 1985), Nigerian footballer

See also
 Fredrick Ogechi Okwara (born 1989), Nigerian footballer